Franz Hermann Rolle (17 September 1864 Freiburg im Breisgau – 12 May 1929, Berlin-Schöneberg) was a German ornithologist and entomologist.

From 1889, Rolle was a natural history dealer in Berlin trading as Institute Kosmos. He sold bird and insect specimens to many museums and private collectors especially to Alexander Koenig. When he retired his entomological collections were sold to
Eugène Le Moult, Paris in 1921/22.

References
Gebhardt  L., 1970 Die Ornithologen Mitteleuropas. Bd. 2. J. Orn. 111, Sh. 110 ff.
Hölzinger J., Die Vögel Baden-Württembergs. Bd. 1. Gefährdung und Schutz, Teil 3. Artenschutzrecht. Historischer Teil. Franz Hermann Roll. Die Vögel Baden Württembergs. 1.3, 1578 ff.
Horn W. & Kahle I., 1935 Über entomologische Sammlungen, Entomologen & Entomo-Museologie. Teil I-III. Berlin-Dahlem, p. 229.
Lamas G., 1981: Rev. Per. Ent. 23,1(1980): 25–31.

External links
Zobodat

German ornithologists
German lepidopterists
1929 deaths
1864 births